Aimee Knight (née Challenor, born 1 October 1997) is a British transgender activist, former spokesperson and electoral candidate for the Green Party, and former Reddit administrator. In 2017, she stood for election in Coventry South, receiving 1.3% of the votes.

In 2018, David Challenor, Knight's father, who had been serving as her election agent, was convicted and jailed for raping and torturing a 10-year-old girl, and for making indecent images of children. Knight's recruitment of her father, despite her knowledge of the charges for 22 sexual offences, led to an investigation and Knight's suspension from the Green Party. She later resigned and joined the Liberal Democrats, but was suspended in 2019 over tweets allegedly posted by her partner concerning sexual fantasies around children. Knight resigned from Stonewall UK at around the same time, leaving the United Kingdom for the United States.

In March 2021, Knight—who had been hired as an administrator by Reddit—became a topic of contention on the website over the coming to light of the abovementioned controversies including her knowledge of her father’s crimes, resulting in several sub-communities protesting her employment by the company. After the banning of a moderator and sitewide protests, an official statement by the website's administrators was released. In it, Reddit confirmed that it had not properly vetted Knight before hiring her and that she was no longer employed by the company.

Personal life
Although assigned male at birth, Knight realised she was a girl around the age of 10. Knight and her two younger siblings were taken into care in 2013 after social services expressed concerns about her parents. Knight came out as trans in 2014; her older sibling is also a transgender woman.

As a child, Knight was diagnosed with autism, attention deficit hyperactivity disorder and oppositional defiant disorder. She was educated at Lewis Charlton Learning Centre, an independent special school for children with emotional and behavioural difficulties. Knight then attended Henley College Coventry, where she was the college's National Union of Students (NUS) lesbian, gay, bisexual, and transgender (LGBT) officer. Knight lived with her mother in Coventry in 2018, while studying for a B.A. in philosophy, politics and economics at the Open University.

When she was 15, Knight was arrested over claims she threatened to crash the Bullring shopping centre website. This led to police raiding the family home. No charges were laid and the case was later dropped.

During 2019, Knight went through the process of changing her legal gender through the Gender Recognition Act 2004 and the British government issued a new birth certificate recognising her as female.

She married Nathaniel Knight, an American, in December 2019.

Career

Green Party
Knight joined the Green Party of England and Wales in November 2014. She was the chair of LGBTIQA+ Greens (LGBT, plus intersex, queer, asexual, and other) between 2015 and 2017. Knight became the party's equality spokesperson in 2016. According to the Green Party, Knight was the only trans spokesperson for a UK political party.

In April 2017, Knight helped co-found the Global Greens LGBT+ Network alongside colleagues from Die Grünen, Groen, Taiwan Tree Party, and Taiwan Green Party.

In July 2017, Knight was the Green candidate for Coventry South. She received 1.3% of the vote share, with 604 votes. Knight stood for Coventry City Council elections as a member of the Green Party in February 2016 and May 2016. She stood in a May 2018 local election and was not elected.

Knight stood in the 2018 party election to be deputy leader, which closed at the end of August. In August 2018, Knight's father David Challenor was sentenced to 22 years in prison for raping and torturing a 10-year-old girl in the attic of the home shared by him, his wife Tina Challenor, and Knight. Knight's father had been reported to the police in 2015 and charged in November 2016. Following this, Knight chose her father as her election agent for the 2017 general election and also the 2018 council elections. Knight had given her father's name as "Baloo Challenor" on campaign materials, later commenting that he was known locally by this nickname. After her father's sentencing, Knight – who insisted she did not know the allegations against her father in full – stood down from the Green Party's deputy leadership election.

David Challenor became a member of the Green Party in December 2015 when Knight gifted him a membership. In November 2016, Knight informed party coordinators by Facebook messenger that he had been charged with the sexual offences. She did not disclose these charges in writing, as is required, when she signed up as a party candidate in 2017 and 2018. When her father was convicted and sentenced in August 2018, he was expelled from the party with immediate effect. Correspondingly, Knight and her mother Tina, were both suspended from the party pending an inquiry, with Knight resigning before the associated disciplinary process got underway.

Knight was consequently suspended from the party on a no-fault basis, and the party launched an inquest into possible safeguarding failures as her father was allowed to act as her election agent after having been charged. In September 2018, Knight resigned from the Green Party citing transphobia; however, Knight continued to cooperate with the inquest. The inquest by Verita found in January 2019 that she had committed a "serious error of judgement" in appointing her father as her campaign manager. The report also said that the Green Party, who were told by Knight that her father had been arrested but not that he was a party member, could have done more to investigate the matter.

Liberal Democrats
In October 2018, she joined the Liberal Democrats, becoming the Diversity Officer of her local party. She was suspended from the Liberal Democrats in July 2019, after tweets appeared on her partner's account admitting to having sexual fantasies involving sex with children. One of the tweets by Nathaniel Knight's account read: "I fantasise about children having sex, sometimes with adults, sometimes with other children, sometimes kidnapped and forced into bad situations." Knight later claimed that her partner's account had been hacked.

Reddit
After working as an unpaid moderator, and then as a contractor for the Reddit Public Access Network, Knight was hired as an administrator by Reddit. In March 2021, Reddit banned a subreddit moderator (on the /r/ukpolitics subreddit) for sharing a Spectator article which mentioned, in passing, the controversy over Knight hiring her father David Challenor as her Green Party campaign manager despite her father having been charged with raping and torturing a 10-year-old girl. This led to confirmation that Reddit was removing all mention of Knight and banning users who mentioned her. A large number of subreddits, including r/Music (which had 27 million subscribers) and at least 20 other subreddits with over one million subscribers each, removed public access in protest of both the bans and of the hiring of Knight. On 24 March, Reddit's CEO Steve Huffman said that Knight had been inadequately vetted before being hired, and that Knight was no longer employed at the company. Huffman also stated that Reddit would review its relevant internal processes and attributed user suspensions to over-indexing on anti-harassment measures.

LGBT activism
In 2015, Knight was the LGBTQ Officer for Henley College Coventry; she protested the college's censoring of websites such as Birmingham Pride, which were considered "Gay or Lesbian or Bisexual Interest" by the college web blocker. Knight was an organiser of Coventry Pride in 2016 and 2017.

After a Transport for London (TfL) helpline employee told Knight that she "didn't sound like a Miss", she successfully campaigned to get TfL to investigate the incident and to use gender-neutral language in announcements, avoiding phrases such as "ladies and gentlemen".

In May 2018, BBC News published an article that quoted writer Miranda Yardley describing Knight as a "man". Knight said that the BBC did not contact her about the article before its publication, though following readers' complaints she was asked to comment, and her response was added to the article.

Knight was a member of the Trans Advisory Group for Stonewall, Britain's largest LGBT charity. She resigned in the summer of 2019 stating there was a "hostile environment towards trans people in the UK" and that she was concerned for her mental health and safety.

References

External links 
 

1997 births
Living people
21st-century English women politicians
21st-century English politicians
Green Party of England and Wales parliamentary candidates
English LGBT politicians
Transgender politicians
Transgender women
Alumni of the Open University
People from Coventry
Alumni of Henley College Coventry
People on the autism spectrum
Liberal Democrats (UK) politicians
Reddit people
21st-century LGBT people